Senator Watson may refer to:

Members of the United States Senate
Clarence Wayland Watson (1864–1940), U.S. Senator from West Virginia from 1911 to 1913
James Eli Watson (1864–1948), U.S. Senator from Indiana from 1916 to 1933
James Watson (New York politician) (1750–1806), U.S. Senator from New York from 1798 to 1800
Thomas E. Watson (1856–1922), U.S. Senator from Georgia from 1921 to 1922

United States state senate members
Ben Watson (politician) (born 1959), Georgia State Senate
Bo Watson (born 1960), Tennessee State Senate
Clinton Watson (1888–1958), Missouri State Senate
Diane Watson (born 1933), California State Senate
Frank Watson (American politician) (born 1945), Illinois State Senate
James F. Watson (1840–1897), Oregon State Senate
James Lopez Watson (1922–2001), New York State Senate
John H. Watson (Vermont judge) (1851–1929), Vermont State Senate
Kirk Watson (born 1958), Texas State Senate
Michael Watson (Mississippi politician) (born 1977), Mississippi State Senate
Murray Watson Jr. (1932–2018), Texas State Senate
Thomas Philip Watson (1933–2015), Oklahoma State Senate 
William T. Watson (1849–1917), Delaware State Senate